Mark V of Alexandria may refer to:

 Patriarch Mark V of Alexandria, Greek Patriarch of Alexandria in 1425–1435
 Pope Mark V of Alexandria, ruled in 1603–1619